Ina, Kapatid, Anak is a soundtrack album of the Philippine drama series of the same name. It was released in the Philippines by Star Music on November 13, 2012, and it was released worldwide thru Amazon and iTunes. Ariel Rivera and Xian Lim provide songs for the soundtrack.

The lead single, "Ngayon at Kailanman", was released on September 14, 2012, along with the music video. It was sung by Ariel Rivera, one of the lead cast of the series.

Track listing

Singles
"Ngayon at Kailanman"
"Kailan"
"Ikaw Lamang"
"Sa Isip Ko"

References

External links
Itunes.apple.com
Spotify
Amazon.com

Television soundtracks
2012 albums